Josef Majer (8 June 1925 – 14 October 2013) was a Czechoslovak football forward who was a member of the Czechoslovakia national team at the 1954 FIFA World Cup. However, he never earned a cap for the national team. He also played for SK Kladno. He died on 14 October 2013 at the age of 88.

References

External links

1925 births
2013 deaths
1954 FIFA World Cup players
Association football forwards
Czechoslovak footballers
SK Kladno players